This is a list of current motifs on the banknotes of different countries. The customary design of banknotes in most countries is a portrait of a notable citizen on the front (or obverse) and a different motif on the back (or reverse) - often something relating to that person. One exception to this is the euro banknotes, where non-existent architectural structures have been chosen to avoid the impression of a national bias. Even though most banknotes have more than one motif on each side, only the main motifs are described here.

Albania
The official currency of Albania is the Albanian lek (ALL). The motifs used are:

Argentina

The official currency of Argentina is the Argentine peso (ARS). The motifs used are:

Australia

The official currency of Australia is the Australian dollar (AUD). The motifs used are:

Brazil

The official currency of Brazil is the Brazilian real (BRL). The motifs used are:

Canada

The official currency of Canada is the Canadian dollar (CAD). The motifs used on the Frontier Series, the most recent banknotes of the Canadian dollar released by the Bank of Canada, are:

China, People's Republic of

The official currency of China is the Chinese yuan (CNY). The motifs used are:

Colombia

The official currency of Colombia is the Colombian peso (COP). The motifs used are:

Croatia

The official currency of Croatia is the Croatian kuna (HRK). The motifs used are:

Czech Republic
The official currency of Czech Republic is the Czech koruna (CZK). The motifs used are:

Denmark

The official currency of Denmark is the Danish krone (DKK). The motifs used are:

Egypt

The official currency of Egypt is the Egyptian pound (EGP). The motifs used are:

Estonia

The former currency of Estonia was the Estonian kroon (EEK). The motifs used are:

Euro area (EU)

The official currency of the 19 Eurozone countries (and a number of other territories) is the euro (EUR). The motifs used are:

Hungary
The official currency of Hungary is the Hungarian forint (HUF). The motifs used are:

Iceland
The official currency of Iceland is the Icelandic króna (ISK). The motifs used are:

India

The official currency of India is the Indian rupee (INR). Currently the Reserve Bank of India issues the Mahatma Gandhi series and the Mahatma Gandhi New Series banknotes. The motifs used in it are:

Indonesia

The official currency of Indonesia is the Indonesian Rupiah (IDR). The motifs used are:

Iran

The official currency of Iran is the Iranian rial (IRR). The motifs used are:

Iraq
The official currency of Iraq is the Iraqi Dinar (IQD). The motifs used are:

2003 Series:

2004 Series:

2006 Series:

2008 Series:

2010 Series:

2012 Series:

2013 Series ( 1434 hijry) Islamic calendar :

2013 Series ( 1435 hijry) Islamic calendar :

2015 Series :

Table of Iraqi Banknotes according to the years of issue:

Japan

The official currency of Japan is the Japanese yen (JPY). The motifs used are:

1984 Series (Series D):

2000 Special (Series D):

2004 Series (Series E):

Jersey

Banknotes of the Jersey pound (JEP) are issued in Jersey. The motifs used are:

Korea, South

The official currency of South Korea is the South Korean Won (KRW). The motifs used are:

Lithuania

The former currency of Lithuania is the Lithuanian litas (LTL). The motifs used are:

Malaysia

The official currency of Malaysia is the Malaysian ringgit (MYR). The motifs used are:

2012 version

New Zealand

The official currency of New Zealand is the New Zealand Dollar (NZD). The motifs used are:

Norway
The official currency of Norway is the Norwegian krone (NOK). The motifs used are:

Pakistan

The official currency of Pakistan is the Pakistani rupee (PKR). The motifs used are:

Paraguay

The official currency of Paraguay is the Paraguayan guaraní (PYG). The motifs used are:

Peru

The official currency of Peru is the Peruvian sol (PEN). The motifs used are:

Philippines
The official currency of the Philippines is the Philippine peso (PHP). The motifs used are:

Poland

The official currency of Poland is the Polish złoty (PLN). The motifs used are:

Romania
The official currency of Romania is the Romanian leu (RON). The motifs used are:

Russia

The official currency of Russia is the Russian ruble (RUB). The motifs used are:

Serbia

The official currency of Serbia is the Serbian dinar (RSD). The motifs used are:

South Africa
The official currency of South Africa is the South African rand (ZAR). The motifs used are:

Sweden
The official currency of Sweden is the Swedish krona (SEK). The motifs used are:

Switzerland

The official currency of Switzerland is the Swiss franc (CHF). The motifs used are:

Republic of China (Taiwan)
The official currency of Taiwan is the New Taiwan dollar (TWD). The motifs used are:

Thailand
The official currency of Thailand is the Thai Baht (THB). The motifs used are:

Turkey

The official currency of Turkey is the Turkish lira (TRY). The motifs used are:

Ukraine

The official currency of Ukraine is the Ukrainian hryvnia (UAH). The motifs used are:

United Kingdom

The currency of the UK is the pound sterling, represented by the symbol £. The Bank of England is the central bank, responsible for issuing currency. Banks in Scotland and Northern Ireland retain the right to issue their own notes, subject to retaining enough Bank of England notes in reserve to cover the issue.

England

The official currency of England is the pound sterling (GBP). The motifs used are:

Scotland
The official currency of Scotland is the Pound sterling (GBP). Under Scottish legislation, banknotes are issued by commercial banks, not the government. The motifs issued by the Bank of Scotland are:

The Royal Bank of Scotland issues:

The Clydesdale Bank issues:

United States

The official currency of the United States is the United States dollar (USD). The motifs used are:

See also

 List of people on banknotes

References

Motifs on banknotes, List of
Banknotes
Numismatics